Ardeshir Cowasjee (13 April 1926 – 24 November 2012) was a Pakistani newspaper columnist, social activist, and philanthropist. Belonging from Karachi, his columns regularly appeared in the country's oldest English newspaper, Dawn. He was also the Chairman of the Cowasjee Group and was engaged in philanthropic activities in addition to being regarded as an old "guardian" of the city of Karachi.

On 3 November 2013, Institute of Business Administration, Karachi launched the Ardeshir Cowasjee Centre for Writing in his honor.

Biography 
Cowasjee was born on 13 April 1926 in Karachi to the Cowasjee Parsi (Zoroastrian) family. His father, Rustom Fakirjee Cowasjee, was a businessman in merchant shipping, and the family spoke Gujarati at home. Ardeshir attended the Bai Virbaiji Soparivala (BVS) Parsi High School and graduated from DJ Science College, Karachi. Later, he joined his father's business, the Cowasjee Group. In 1953, he married Nancy Dinshaw, with whom he had two children – Ava (daughter) and Rustom (son).

Career 
Cowasjee owned a family run shipping company, that at the time of the independence of Pakistan was Karachi's largest shipping company. This shipping company was nationalized during Zulfiqar Ali Bhutto's premiership. He was appointed by Prime Minister Zulfikar Ali Bhutto as Managing Director of Pakistan Tourism Development Corporation (PTDC) in 1973. He was jailed for 72 days in 1976 by Zulfikar Ali Bhutto for which no explanation has been given to date; it is said that Prime Minister Bhutto did this because Cowasjee was becoming increasingly vocal about Bhutto's authoritarian ways. Cowasjee subsequently started writing letters to the editor of Dawn newspaper, which led to him becoming a permanent columnist. Since then, his hard-hitting and well-researched columns in Dawn have continuously exposed corruption, nepotism, and incompetence in different local, provincial, and national governments. Cowasjee's last article for Dawn was published on 25 December 2011.

Los Angeles Times described him thus: "His is a stubborn non-Muslim voice in this nation created as an Islamic homeland, refusing to be silenced. Attempts have been made. His life has been threatened so often the government has provided him with 24-hour protection.

Activities 
Via the Cowasjee Foundation, Cowasjee was the financier of many scholarships for students wishing to pursue higher education. These included grants for both local and overseas education. They were termed "loans" and Cowasjee encouraged recipients to repay them so that others could benefit from the funds; however, he expected that the majority of the funds would not be repaid.

Death 
Cowasjee died at the age of 86, on 24 November 2012. He was suffering from chest illness and remained in hospital for twelve days.

References

External links 
 Cowasjee's archives in Dawn Newspaper
 Dawn coverage of his passing

1926 births
Parsi writers
Pakistani philanthropists
Pakistani industrialists
Pakistani male journalists
Pakistani columnists
Parsi people
Pakistani Zoroastrians
Pakistani socialites
Dawn (newspaper) people
B. V. S. Parsi High School alumni
2012 deaths
Journalists from Karachi
Businesspeople from Karachi
Pakistani people of Gujarati descent
20th-century philanthropists